L'Amour Toujours II is the third studio album by Italian DJ Gigi D'Agostino, released in on 16 December 2004 through Media Italy Records. It is a sequel to his 1999 album L'Amour Toujours.

Track listing

Side one
"Welcome to Paradise [Gigi d'Agostino's Way]"
"Angel [Gigi d'Agostino's Way]"
"Total Care [Vision2]"
"Wellfare [Elettro Gigi Dag]"
"The Rain [Gigi d'Agostino's Way]"
"Together in a Dream [Elettro Gigi Dag]"
"Goodnight [Gigi d'Agostino's Way]"
"I Wonder Why [Vision 5]"
"Sonata [Gigi & Luca Trip]"
"Complex"
"Silence (To Comprehend the Conditioning)"
"Nothing Else"
"On Eagle's Wings"
"L'Amour Toujours (I Wish Real Peace)"
"Another Way (In Spiaggia Al Tramonto)"

Side two
"Canto Do Mar [Gigi d'Agostino Pescatore Mix]"
"Summer of Energy [Viaggio Mix]"
"Marcetta"
"Percorrendo [Gigi's Impression]"
"Gigi's Way [Andando Altrove]"
"Tangology"
"Momento Contento"
"Dance 'N' Roll"
"Paura E Nobiltà  [Ribadisco Mix]"
"Bolero"
"Angel [Elettro Gigi Dag]"
"The Rain [Vision 3]"
"Total Care [Elettro Gigi Dag]"
"Imagine [Gigi d'Agostino's Way]"
"Toccando le Nuvole [Gigi's Impression]"

References

2004 albums
Gigi D'Agostino albums